Petrophila doriscalis is a moth in the family Crambidae. It was described by Schaus in 1940. It is found in Puerto Rico.

References

Petrophila
Moths described in 1940